Yoovidhya is a Thai surname. Notable people with the surname include:

Chaleo Yoovidhya (1923–2012), Thai businessman and investor
Chalerm Yoovidhya (born 1950), Thai businessman, son of Chaleo

Thai-language surnames